Cass is an unincorporated community in Cass Township, Sullivan County, in the U.S. state of Indiana.

The community is part of the Terre Haute Metropolitan Statistical Area.

History
A post office was established at Cass in 1877, and remained in operation until it was discontinued in 1955.

Geography

References

Unincorporated communities in Sullivan County, Indiana
Unincorporated communities in Indiana
Terre Haute metropolitan area